Sweet & Sour Tears is a 1964 album by Ray Charles. It is a concept album featuring songs with titles or lyrics referring to crying. In 1997, Rhino Records reissued the album on compact disc with seven bonus tracks from his early career (1956-1971) that added to the "crying" theme.

Critical reception 

The album is included in Robert Christgau's "Basic Record Library" of 1950s and 1960s recordings, published in Christgau's Record Guide: Rock Albums of the Seventies (1981). He later hailed the Rhino reissue as the best of the label's reissue program for Charles' ABC albums, saying both producer Sid Feller and the bonus tracks were suited for the original album's crying theme.

Track listing

Side one
 "Cry" (Churchill Kohlman) – 3:34
 "Guess I'll Hang My Tears Out to Dry" (Sammy Cahn, Jule Styne) – 4:20
 "A Tear Fell" (Eugene Randolph, Dorian Burton) – 2:45
 "No One to Cry To" (Sid Robin, Foy Glenn Willing) – 2:43
 "You've Got Me Crying Again" (Isham Jones, Charles Newman) – 2:52
 "After My Laughter Came Tears" (Charles Tobias, Roy Turk) – 3:13

Side two
 "Teardrops from My Eyes" (Rudolph Toombs) – 3:29
 "Don't Cry Baby" (Saul Bernie, James P. Johnson, Stella Unger) – 3:09
 "Cry Me a River" (Arthur Hamilton) – 3:20
 "Baby, Don't You Cry" (Buddy Johnson, Ned Washington) – 2:40
 "Willow, Weep for Me" (Ann Ronell) – 4:37
 "I Cried for You" (Arthur Freed, Abe Lyman, Gus Arnheim) – 2:40

Bonus tracks (1997 CD release)
 "My Heart Cries for You" (Carl Sigman, Percy Faith) – 2:51
 "I Wake Up Crying" (Burt Bacharach, Hal David) – 3:00
 "Drown in My Own Tears" (Henry Glover) – 3:21
 "Teardrops in My Heart" (Vaughn Horton) – 3:05
 "Crying Time" (Buck Owens) – 2:58
 "No Use Crying" (Freddie Lee Kober, J.B. Daniels, Roy Gaines) – 3:19
 "Tired of My Tears" (Jimmy Holiday, Jimmy Lewis) – 2:23

Personnel
Ray Charles – vocals, keyboards
Gene Lowell Singers – backing vocals
Billy Preston – electric organ on "No Use Crying"
Calvin Jackson, Sid Feller – arrangements
Technical
Bill Putnam, Phil Macy – engineer
Joe Lebow – design
Howard Morehead – photography

References

External links
[ Album review at AMG]

1964 albums
Ray Charles albums
Albums arranged by Sid Feller
Albums produced by Sid Feller
Albums produced by Ray Charles
ABC Records albums